Auguste von Bärndorf (complete name: von Bärndorff von Bauerhorst) (11 March 1823 – 8 March 1911) was a German stage actress.

Life 
Born in Berlin, Bärndorff grew up on her parents' estate near Berlin. At the age of 16, after examining her talent and following a letter of recommendation from the actress Charlotte von Hagn, she received acting lessons from Auguste Crelinger. In 1846, she made her debut as Philippine in 100 Years Ago at the Königliches Schauspielhaus Berlin and was subsequently engaged in Oldenburg.

From 1848 to 1857, Bärndorf played as an Imperial Court Actress in Saint Petersburg, then went to Hanover in 1857 and remained there as a leading member of the Court Theatre celebrated actress. From 1868, she appeared only sporadically, taking her stage farewell in 1870.

Bärndorf enjoyed success especially in classical lover roles, but also in comedies. She made guest appearances in Vienna as well as in the US. In 1881, she was made an honorary member of the Staatsoper Hannover.

Bärndorf was a married von Schoultz in her first marriage and in her second marriage to the Prague university lecturer Anton Jaksch Ritter von Wartenhorst. When the latter died in 1887, she lived initially in Baden-Baden, then later in Rome. She died in Rome aged 87 and is buried in the Protestant Cemetery, Rome.

She also trained her niece  to be an actress.

References

Further reading 
 Ludwig Eisenberg: Großes biographisches Lexikon der Deutschen Bühne im XIX. Jahrhundert. Verlag von Paul List, Leipzig 1903,.
 Walther Killy, Rudolf Vierhaus (eds.): Deutsche Biographische Enzyklopädie, vol. 1, Munich 1895, 
 Wilhelm Kosch: Deutsches Theater-Lexikon, vol. 1, Klagenfurt, Vienna 1953, pp. 894f.
 Hugo Thielen: Bärndorf(f) von Bauerhorst, Auguste von. In Dirk Böttcher, Klaus Mlynek, Waldemar R. Röhrbein, Hugo Thielen: . Von den Anfängen bis in die Gegenwart. Schlütersche, Hanover 2002,  (Auszug bei Google Books)
 Hugo Thielen: Bärndorf(f) von Bauerhorst, Auguste von. In Klaus Mlynek, Waldemar R. Röhrbein (eds.) among others.: . Von den Anfängen bis in die Gegenwart. Schlütersche, Hanover 2009, .

External links 
 
 Auguste von Bärndorf, portrait by Auguste Hüssener on Europeana.eu

German stage actresses
1823 births
1911 deaths
Actresses from Berlin